Fereydoun Ghanbari (23 September 1977, Kermanshah, Iran – 17 April 2021) was an Iranian wrestler. He won Gold medal at the 2004 Asian Wrestling Championships. In 1997 he won the gold medal at Junior World Freestyle Wrestling Championships in Helsinki. He died on the 17 April 2021 due to pancreatitis after some days admitted in hospital.

References

External links
Profile

1977 births
2021 deaths
Iranian male sport wrestlers
Sportspeople from Kermanshah
Deaths from pancreatitis